John Francis Picard (born 17 May 1934 in Tottenham, London, England) is an English jazz trombonist.

Biography
Picard starting learning music in 1941 by taking lessons on the piano when aged seven years old. After serving in the RAF, during which he played at weekends with Cy Laurie, he spent a further four months with Laurie before joining Humphrey Lyttelton, from 1954 until 1961. From 1962 to the early 1970s, he worked with Tony Coe as well as co-leading a quintet with Kathy Stobart in the late 1960s. From 1975 to 1973, he was a member of the London Jazz Big Band, led by Stan Greig.

During the early 1980s, with his friends Ian Stewart, Colin Smith and Dick Morrissey, he was a founding member of Rocket 88, and later went on to join the Charlie Watts Big Band.

Picard's son is tenor saxophonist Simon Picard.

References

Bibliography
John Chilton, Who’s Who of British Jazz. Continuum International Publishing Group, 2004

1934 births
Living people
English jazz trombonists
Male trombonists
21st-century trombonists
21st-century British male musicians
British male jazz musicians